This is a list of named chairs at Harvard University.

 Boylston Professor of Rhetoric and Oratory
 Gardiner Professor of Oceanic History and Affairs
 Hancock Professor of Hebrew and other Oriental languages
 Hollis Chair of Divinity
 Hollis Chair of Mathematics and Natural Philosophy
 McLean Professor of Ancient and Modern History
 Perkins Professorship of Astronomy and Mathematics
 Wales Professor of Sanskrit
 Winn Professorship of Ecclesiastical History

Bibliography
  Harvard University has published in 2004 a comprehensive list of Endowed chairs "Harvard University History of Named Chairs:  Sketches of Donors and Donations 1991 – 2004 : https://alumni.neurosurgery.mgh.harvard.edu/docs/Harvard_Professorsips_Book_1991-2004.pdf

Professorships at Harvard University